Yuwak is a village in central-western Bhutan. It is located north-east of the capital Thimphu in Thimphu District. It lies at an altitude of 1390 metres (4560 ft).

Nearby settlements include Dotanang (13 miles), Tshalunang (12.6 miles),  Punakha (6 miles), Pajo (1.3 miles), Gasila (11.6 miles) and Wangdue Phodrang (2.7 miles).

See also 
List of cities, towns and villages in Bhutan

Populated places in Bhutan